To Rome with Love is a 2012 magical realist romantic comedy film written, directed by and co-starring Woody Allen in his first acting appearance since 2006, as well as his most recent appearance in a film he's directed. The film is set in Rome, Italy; it was released in Italian theaters on April 13, 2012, and opened in Los Angeles and New York City on June 22, 2012.

The film features an ensemble cast, including Allen himself. The story is told in four separate vignettes: a clerk who wakes up to find himself a celebrity, an architect who takes a trip back to the street he lived on as a student, a young couple on their honeymoon, and an Italian funeral director whose uncanny singing ability enraptures his soon to be in-law, an American opera director.

Plot

Hayley's Story
American tourist Hayley becomes engaged to lawyer Michelangelo while spending a summer in Rome. Hayley's parents, Jerry and Phyllis, fly to Italy to meet her fiancé. During the visit, Michelangelo's mortician father Giancarlo sings in the shower and Jerry, a retired—and critically reviled—opera director, feels inspired to bring his gift to the public. Giancarlo is convinced by Jerry to audition in front of a room of opera bigwigs but performs poorly in this setting.

Jerry then realizes that Giancarlo's talent is tied to the comfort and freedom he feels in the shower. He stages a concert in which Giancarlo performs at the Teatro dell'Opera while actually washing himself onstage in a shower. This is a great success, so Jerry and Giancarlo decide to stage Pagliacci with an incongruous shower present in all scenes. Giancarlo receives rave reviews, but decides to retire from opera singing, preferring to work as a mortician and spend time with his family.

Antonio's Story
Newlyweds Antonio and Milly plan to move to Rome after his uncles offer him a job in their family's business. Before meeting Antonio's relatives, Milly gets lost in Rome and loses her cell phone. After ending up at a film shoot, Milly meets Luca Salta, an actor she idolizes. Back at her hotel, Anna, a prostitute, is mistakenly sent to Antonio's room.

Before he can clarify the misunderstanding, his relatives arrive. To save face, Antonio convinces her to pose as Milly. The group goes to lunch, and then, to a party. While there, Antonio talks to Anna about how pure Milly is. After discovering he was a virgin before meeting Milly, she seduces him in the bushes.

Meanwhile, Luca tries to seduce Milly at his hotel room. Milly decides to have sex with him, but then an armed thief breaks in. Later, Luca's wife and a private investigator show up. Milly and the thief climb into bed and fool Mrs. Salta into believing the room is theirs while Luca hides in the bathroom. Once his wife has left, Luca runs off. The burglar flirts with Milly and she has sex with him instead. After returning to the hotel room, she and Antonio decide to return to their rustic hometown—but first they begin to make love.

Leopoldo's Story
Leopoldo lives a mundane life with his wife and two children. Inexplicably, he wakes up one morning to discover that he has become a national celebrity. Paparazzi document his every move, wanting to know everything about him. Leopoldo even becomes a manager at his company and begins dating models and attending prestigious events. The constant attention wears on him, though. One day, in the middle of an interview, the paparazzi spot a man "who looks more interesting" and abandon Leopoldo. At first, Leopoldo welcomes the return to his old life, but one afternoon he breaks down, missing the attention.

John's Story
John, a well-known architect, visits Rome with his wife and their friends. He lived there some 30 years ago, and would rather revisit his old haunts than go sightseeing with the others. While looking for his old apartment building, John meets Jack, an American architecture student who recognizes him. Jack happens to live in John's old building, and invites him to the apartment he shares with his girlfriend Sally. Throughout the rest of the story, John appears as a quasi-real and quasi-imaginary figure around Jack and makes frank observations of events. One day, Sally invites her best friend Monica to stay with them. Jack hits it off with her, and the two end up having an affair.

Jack, now besotted with her, plans to leave Sally, but decides to wait until she finishes her midterms. When that day comes, Monica receives the news that she has been cast in a Hollywood blockbuster. Becoming completely focused on preparing for the role, Monica forgets about traveling with Jack, who realizes how shallow she is. John and Jack later part ways. It is possible that John's whole experience was actually his memory of what happened to him 30 years ago. (It is loosely implied that Sally is now his wife.)

Cast
Grouped by storylines

 , the TG3 anchorwoman, is a real-life journalist of the Italian network Rai 3. The scene is shot in the real TG3 studio.
 Pierluigi Marchionne, who plays a traffic policeman in the initial sequence, is a real Rome policeman. Woody Allen saw him directing traffic in Piazza Venezia and added that scene for him to be in.

Production
To Rome with Love tells four unrelated stories taking place in Rome. Antonio's story, is a direct lift with some amendments of an entire Federico Fellini film, The White Sheik (1952).

Financial backing for To Rome with Love came from distributors in Rome who offered to finance a film for Allen as long as it was filmed in Rome. Allen accepted, seeing the offer as a way to work in the city and "get the money to work quickly and from a single source". The four vignettes featured in the film were based on ideas and notes he had written throughout the year before he wrote the script. The vignettes featured in the film deal with the theme of "fame and accomplishment", although Allen stated that he didn't intend for them to have any thematic connection. He initially named the film Bop Decameron, a reference to the 14th century book by Italian author Giovanni Boccaccio, but several people did not understand the reference, so he retitled it Nero Fiddles. The new title was still met with confusion, so he settled on the final title To Rome with Love, although he has stated that he hates this title.

Release
In December 2011, Sony Pictures Classics acquired distribution rights to the film.

Box office
To Rome with Love was a box office success. , it has earned $16,685,867 in the United States and $73,039,208 worldwide.

Critical reception
The film has generally received mixed reviews from critics. The review aggregator Rotten Tomatoes gives the film a score of 46% based on reviews from 179 critics with an average score of 5.4/10. The critical consensus is that "To Rome With Love sees Woody Allen cobbling together an Italian postcard of farce, fantasy, and comedy with only middling success." Metacritic gives the film an average score of 54 out of 100, and thus "mixed or average reviews", based on 38 professional critics. Roger Ebert gave the film 3 stars out of 4, writing: "To Rome With Love generates no particular excitement or surprise, but it provides the sort of pleasure he seems able to generate almost on demand."

A. O. Scott of The New York Times found some of the scenes "rushed and haphazardly constructed" and some of the dialogue "overwritten and under-rehearsed", but also recommended it, writing "One of the most delightful things about To Rome With Love is how casually it blends the plausible and the surreal, and how unabashedly it revels in pure silliness." On the other hand, David Denby of The New Yorker thought the film was "light and fast, with some of the sharpest dialogue and acting that he's put on the screen in years."

In 2016, film critics Robbie Collin and Tim Robey ranked it as one of the worst movies by Woody Allen.

Controversies
On November 10, 2017, Elliot Page wrote a post on his official Facebook page in which he described working on To Rome with Love as the "biggest regret" of his career, referring to sexual abuse allegations made by Allen's adopted daughter Dylan Farrow. He claimed that he felt pressured by others who told him, "of course you have to say yes to this Woody Allen film." In January 2018, Greta Gerwig said that she regretted working on the film.

Notes

References

External links
 
 
 
 
 
 
 To Rome With Love at The Numbers
 "Ellen Page And Greta Gerwig". On Point. June 19, 2012.
 

2012 films
2012 independent films
2012 romantic comedy films
American anthology films
American independent films
American romantic comedy films
Films about actors
Films about classical music and musicians
Films about the media
Films directed by Woody Allen
Films produced by Letty Aronson
Films produced by Stephen Tenenbaum
Films set in Rome
Films shot in Rome
Films with screenplays by Woody Allen
Hyperlink films
Italian anthology films
Italian romantic comedy films
2010s Italian-language films
Magic realism films
Sony Pictures Classics films
Adaptations of works by Federico Fellini
2010s English-language films
2010s American films